The Liquor Party is a former political party in Sweden, that was established as an across-political boundaries single-issue party with policies that majored on the health effects of the consumption of alcohol. The party was founded, in 2009, by actor Benny Haag. They ran in the 2010 Swedish general election on September 19 and gained 237 votes becoming the 13th biggest party outside the parliament.

See also
Social welfare in Sweden

References

External links
  

Political parties established in 2009
Minor political parties in Sweden
2009 establishments in Sweden